Papurana arfaki is a species of true frog, family Ranidae. It is widely distributed in New Guinea (in both Western New Guinea and Papua New Guinea) and also found on the Aru Islands (Indonesia). Common names Arfak Mountains frog and large river-frog have been coined for it. Its type locality is the Arfak Mountains.

Description
Adult males measure at least  and adult females  in snout–vent length; they can reach  or more. The snout is rounded. The head is as long as it is wide or slightly longer. The toes are fully webbed, and both the fingers and the toes have grooved terminal discs. Skin is very warty in juveniles and in adult males, very rugose in adult females. Continuous dorso-lateral folds are not present. Dorsal colouration is plain dark brown, sometimes mottled with white. The ventrum is white mottled with brown on the throat.

The male advertisement call is a squeaky note, uttered singly or in short series.

Habitat and conservation
It breeds in the same rivers and streams. It is a common species that is consumed locally in large numbers. However, the overall population is believed to be stable, and it occurs in several protected areas.

References

arfaki
Amphibians of Indonesia
Amphibians of Papua New Guinea
Amphibians of Western New Guinea
Taxa named by Christian Erich Hermann von Meyer
Amphibians described in 1875